Derek Vincent Lee (born October 2, 1948) is a Canadian former politician. From 1988 to 2011 he was the Liberal Member of Parliament for the riding of Scarborough—Rouge River.

Background
Lee was born in Cape Breton, Nova Scotia. His father was an RCMP officer. He attended Neil McNeil High School and graduated in 1966. Before entering politics, he was a political assistant to Federal MP Paul Cosgrove in 1982 and also Ontario Housing Minister Alvin Curling in 1985.

He is married to Ingrid Lee, and has two children, Katherine and Mackenzie.

Politics
In 1984, he lost a nomination bid for Liberal candidacy in the old riding of York—Scarborough. In 1988, he was first elected to the House of Commons in Scarborough—Rouge River and was re-elected in every election until he retired in 2011. In the run up to the 1993 Federal election he was in danger of losing a nomination battle to challenger Gobinder Randhawa. However Liberal leader Jean Chrétien intervened and designated Lee as the candidate. From 1999 to 2001 he was the parliamentary secretary to the leader of the government in the House of Commons.

During his tenure as MP, he supported judicial reform. In 1993, he tabled a private member's bill that would have given rape victims the right to have blood samples taken from an offender.

On March 24, 2011, Lee announced that he was retiring from politics. He said it was "time to press the refresh button" for the riding that he has represented for 23 years.

Books
Lee has written two books which discuss regulations of the House of Commons.

 Matters related to the review of the Office of the Privacy Commissioner: report of the Standing Committee on Government Operations and Estimates. (2003).
 Improving the Supreme Court of Canada appointments process: report of the Standing Committee on Justice, Human Rights, Public Safety and Emergency Preparedness. (2004).

Beliefs
While Lee was a member of the Liberal party, he espoused social conservative viewpoints. Contrary to Liberal party policy, he expressed anti-abortion views, and also supported the death penalty. He said "I believe the death penalty should always be available to reflect the degree of society's disgust at certain capital crimes." He also opposed same sex marriage.

Lee also received criticism for his support of the controversial Church of Scientology. Lee addressed Scientology seminars and appeared in a promotional video for the Church of Scientology. Lee identifies as a Roman Catholic and is not a member of the Church of Scientology. He once considered becoming a priest but he is no longer drawn to the Roman Catholic religion. "I have done some cursory reading. I'm not personally drawn to [Catholicism], but I have to say that about many religious faiths."

References

External links
 

1948 births
Liberal Party of Canada MPs
Living people
Members of the House of Commons of Canada from Ontario
People from Halifax, Nova Scotia
People from Scarborough, Toronto
Politicians from Toronto
21st-century Canadian politicians